Andrei Vladimirovich Yevdokhin (born 22 May 1982) is a former Russian professional football player.

Club career
He played in the Russian Football National League for FC Oryol in 2006.

Honours
 Russian Second Division Zone South best goalkeeper: 2005.

External links
 
 

1982 births
Living people
Russian footballers
Association football goalkeepers
FC Rotor Volgograd players
FC Oryol players
FC Volga Nizhny Novgorod players
FC Avangard Kursk players
FC Petrotrest players
FC Gornyak Uchaly players
FC Olimpia Volgograd players
FC Torpedo Vladimir players
Sportspeople from Volgograd